The 1978 Brisbane Rugby League premiership was the 71st season of Brisbane's semi-professional rugby league football competition. Eight teams from across Brisbane competed for the premiership, which culminated in a grand final match between the  Eastern Suburbs and Fortitude Valley clubs.

Season summary 
Teams played each other three times, with 21 rounds of competition played. It resulted in a top four of Eastern Suburbs, Redcliffe, Western Suburbs and Fortitude Valley.

Teams

Finals

Grand Final 

Eastern Suburbs 14 (Tries: R. Morris, G. Holben. Goals: G. McDonald 3, W. Lindenburg.)

Fortitude Valley 10 (Tries: V. Wieland, M. Neill. Goals: M. Neill, A. Mills.)

References

Rugby league in Brisbane
Brisbane Rugby League season